The Hunter Mountains of Lake Manapouri, New Zealand, were named by surveyor James McKerrow after the famous anatomist John Hunter. The Hunter Mountain Range covers an area between The South Arm and Hope Arm of Lake Manapouri South to the Green Lake.

The Hunters contains several impressive peaks,  Cone Peak,  Mount Moturau,  Mount Crescent,  Mt Burns,  Eldrig Peak, the Highest Named Point is  Mt Flat, the highest point is an  unnamed peak at the head of the Garnoch Burn. Mount Moturau is accessible Via the Bicycle spur track from Hope Arm and Mt Burns is very accessible Via the Borland Saddle Road, built through Fiordland National Park in the 1960s for the construction of the power pylons and power pines for the Manapouri Hydroelectric Power Station, and is open to the public throughout the summer months.

Fauna
Giant Snails known as Powelliphanta spedeni are found in the Green Lake area of the Hunter Mountains.

The skink species Oligosoma nigriplantare polychroma (related to the Chatham Islands skink) inhabit the tussock grasslands areas from Lake Manapouri to Lake Monowai.

The Short Horned Grasshopper Alpinacris tumidicauda ranges throughout the Hunter Mountains.

The endemic moth species Pyrgotis consentiens and Proteodes clarkei are found in the Hunter Mountains.

References

  Neville Peat and Brian Patrick. 1996 "Wild Fiordland", published by University of Otago Press, 
  John Hall-Jones. 1983 "Pioneers of Te Anau", published by Craig Printing Co Ltd, 

Mountain ranges of Fiordland